ADD is short for attention deficit disorder, and is an older name for attention deficit hyperactivity disorder.
 
Add or ADD may also refer to:

Entertainment
 A.D.D. (Audio Day Dream), a 2007 album by Blake Lewis
 "A.D.D", a song on the 1998 album Hard to Swallow by Vanilla Ice
 "A.D.D. (American Dream Denial)", a song on the 2002 album Steal This Album! by System of a Down
 “ADD”, a song on the 2017 album Mix & Match by  Loona sub-unit Odd Eye Circle

Science and technology
 Addition, a mathematical operation
 ADD model, a hypothesis in physics
 Agency for Defense Development, a South Korean national research and development agency
 Android Developer Day
 Accumulated degree days, a measure of heating or cooling
 Architectural design document (or sometimes Architectural decision document), part of a software design document
 ADD, a SPARS code appearing on some compact disc recordings

Transportation
 Adderley Park railway station (Station code), Birmingham, England
 Addis Ababa Bole International Airport (IATA code), Addis Ababa, Ethiopia

Other uses
 River Add, Scotland
 Anti-dumping duties; see Dumping (pricing policy)
 Atatürkist Thought Association, a Turkish secularism organization
 Dzodinka language (ISO 639-3 code), a Niger-Congo language of Cameroon
 Agency for Defense Development, a South Korean government agency

See also
 Accidental death and dismemberment insurance (AD&D)
 Advanced Dungeons & Dragons, an edition of the game Dungeons & Dragons